A v. B plc is a 2003 case in English law in which a Premiership footballer sought an injunction to prevent a Sunday newspaper from publishing details of his extra-marital affair.  The Court of Appeal granted a temporary injunction against publication.  The case established that it is not for the press to show a public interest in publication but for the applicant to show why a free press should be overborne.

Lord Woolf remarked in the case "Where an individual is a public figure he is entitled to have his privacy respected.  A public figure is entitled to a private life" but a celebrity  "should recognise that because of his public position he must expect and accept that his actions will be more closely scrutinised by the media."

See also
Privacy in English law

References

English privacy case law
Court of Appeal (England and Wales) cases
2002 in case law
2002 in British law